Doe v. Regional School Unit 26 (also referred to as Doe v. Clenchy) was an anti-discrimination case decided by the Maine Supreme Judicial Court in June 2013. In that case, transgender teenager Nicole Maines won the right to use the female bathroom in her high school. Upon initial filing, Maines was referenced by the pseudonym "Susan Doe" in court papers to protect her identity. This case marked the first time that a state court ruled that denying a transgender student access to the bathroom consistent with their gender identity is unlawful.

The case stemmed from an incident when Maines was in elementary school and the grandfather of a classmate complained after learning that Maines had used the female bathroom. Following this, Maines was forced to use the staff bathroom, which resulted in her parents suing the school district for discrimination. In June 2014, the Maine Supreme Judicial Court ruled that the school district had violated the Human Rights Act, and prohibited the district from barring transgender students access to bathrooms consistent with their gender identity. Maines and her family were awarded $75,000.

References

Further reading
Boston Globe article
Huffington Post article

United States transgender rights case law
Student rights case law in the United States
LGBT in Maine
2013 in LGBT history
2013 in United States case law